The Gulf Trough, also known as the Suwanee Straits, is an ancient geologic feature of Florida present during the Paleogene period, a period of roughly  that started after the end of the Mesozoic Era (65.5 Mya). A strong marine current, similar to the Gulf Stream, scoured the trough from southwest to northeast.

History
During the Paleogene, what would become Florida was the submerged Florida Platform, a feature not unlike the Bahama Banks composed of carbonate sediments containing foraminifera, corals, bryozoa, and mollusks. Due to the current running through the Gulf Trough, materials needed for sedimentation were instead carried away toward the northeast. 

By the Early Miocene, considered the start of the Neogene, the trough was filled, and materials continued to move southward covering and replacing the carbonate-depositing marine environment with sands, silts, and clays; these sediments created the peninsula on which terrestrial flora and fauna could become established.

References

Burnett, William C., Cook, P. J., Riggs, Stanley R., Shergold, J. H., Phosphate Deposits of the World: Neogene to modern phosphorites, Cambridge University Press (May 25, 1990)

External links
Florida Geological Survey Bulletin 47, Florida Center for Library Automation

Geology of Florida
Physical oceanography
Straits of the Atlantic Ocean